Pinus jeffreyi, also known as Jeffrey pine, Jeffrey's pine, yellow pine and black pine, is a North American pine tree. It is mainly found in California, but also in the westernmost part of Nevada, southwestern Oregon, and northern Baja California. It is named in honor of its botanist documenter John Jeffrey.

Description

Pinus jeffreyi is closely related to Pinus ponderosa (ponderosa pine) and is similar in appearance. One way to distinguish between them is by their cones. Each has barbs at the end of the scales. The sharp Pinus jeffreyi cone scale barbs point inward, so the cone feels smooth to the palm of one's hand when rubbed down the cone. Pinus ponderosa cone scale barbs point outward, so feel sharp and prickly to the palm of one's hands. The memory device of 'gentle Jeffrey' and 'prickly ponderosa' can be used to differentiate between the species. Another distinguishing characteristic is that the needles of Pinus jeffreyi are glaucous, less bright green than those of Pinus ponderosa, and by the stouter, heavier cones with larger seeds and inward-pointing barbs. Pinus jeffreyi can be somewhat distinguished from Pinus ponderosa by the relatively smaller scales of reddish-brown bark as compared to the larger plates of orangish ponderosa bark.

The scent of Pinus jeffreyi is variously described as reminiscent of vanilla, lemon, pineapple, violets, apple, and, quite commonly, butterscotch. This scent may be sampled by breaking off a shoot or some needles, or by simply smelling the resin's scent in between the plates of the bark. This scent is related to the very unusual composition of the resin, with the volatile component made up almost entirely of pure n-heptane.

The largest Pinus jeffreyi, by trunk volume, is the Eureka Valley Giant, in the Stanislaus National Forest.

Distribution and habitat
Pinus jeffreyi occurs from southwest Oregon south through much of California (mainly on the eastern side of the Sierra Nevada), to northern Baja California in Mexico.

Pinus jeffreyi is more stress tolerant than Pinus ponderosa. At higher elevations, on poorer soils, in colder climates, and in drier climates, Pinus jeffreyi replaces Pinus ponderosa as the dominant tree. Pinus jeffreyi is also tolerant of serpentine soils and is often dominant in these conditions, even on dry sites at fairly low altitudes.

Ecology
Pinus jeffreyi can hybridize with Pinus ponderosa and the Coulter pine, however this occurrence is rare due to the fact that the pines release pollen at different periods of time, and they naturally have difficulty crossing. However, hybrids do occasionally occur.

Uses
Pinus jeffreyi wood is similar to ponderosa pine wood, and is used for the same purposes. Crystallized sap of Pinus jeffreyi has been eaten as candy. The exceptional purity of n-heptane distilled from Pinus jeffreyi resin led to n-heptane being selected as the zero point on the octane rating scale of petrol.

As it mainly consists of n-heptane, Pinus jeffreyi resin is a poor source of turpentine. Before Pinus jeffreyi was distinguished from ponderosa pine as a distinct species in 1853, resin distillers operating in its range suffered a number of "inexplicable" explosions during distillation, now known to have been caused by the unwitting use of Jeffrey pine resin.

Taxonomy 
Pinus jeffreyi is named for its discoverer, Scottish botanist John Jeffrey, who encountered it in 1852 near Mount Shasta. Pinus is Latin for pine.

See also
 List of California native plants
 Sentinel Dome

References

Further reading

External links

 
 

jeffreyi
Trees of Baja California
Trees of the Southwestern United States
Trees of the Northwestern United States
Trees of the United States
Flora of California
Flora of Oregon
Flora of the Sierra Nevada (United States)
Natural history of the California Coast Ranges
Least concern flora of the United States
Plants described in 1853
Taxa named by John Hutton Balfour